My Love Is Cool is the debut studio album by English alternative rock band Wolf Alice. It was released on 22 June 2015 in the United Kingdom by Dirty Hit and on 23 June 2015 in the United States by RCA Records. The album includes the previously released singles "Bros" and "Fluffy" in re-recorded versions, and was preceded by the songs "Giant Peach" and "You're a Germ". The song "Moaning Lisa Smile", which originally appeared on the band's 2014 EP Creature Songs, peaked at number nine on the US Billboard Alternative Songs chart, and was also included on the US edition of the album. While not a single, the song "Silk" appeared on the soundtrack of T2 Trainspotting, peaking at number 39 on the Scottish charts in 2017.

The album was nominated for the 2015 Mercury Music Prize. On 19 August 2016, My Love Is Cool was reissued as a limited-edition box set, containing a 12-inch double gatefold vinyl of the album, 10-inch vinyl copies of the Blush and Creature Songs EPs, and a bonus CD of demos, B-sides and rarities.

Critical reception

My Love Is Cool received positive reviews from critics. At Metacritic, which assigns a normalized rating out of 100 to reviews from mainstream critics, the album received an average score of 78, based on 21 reviews, indicating generally favorable reviews. Harriet Gibsone of The Guardian called the album "familiar but invigorating indie-rock", further stating: "while the foundations of My Love Is Cool are 90s/00s shoegaze and grunge, the London quartet defibrillate their influences with the ambition of youth. It also feels like an album that's been allowed time to gestate: despite being virtually veteran in buzzband terms, they have benefited from beefing up their sound on tour – as evidenced on the heavy romance of 'Your Loves Whore', the dirty degenerate chug of 'You're a Germ', or the cinematic 'Turn to Dust'. The awkward introversion in the lyrics – which deal with relationship strife, creepy blokes, friendship, gender and the quest for eternal love – add a sense of emotional overload driven by late nights, blood pacts and wide-eyed wonder. It's an invigorating debut with a gaunt, gallant identity of its own." Harriet Gibsone, also of The Guardian, described the album musically as "grungy, dream-pop."

Stephen Ackroyd of DIY praised the album, saying "My Love Is Cool isn't simply a great debut. It's not just a great album full stop. It's, in no uncertain terms, a remarkable one. The furthest from route one they could ever get, Wolf Alice aren't just sure of who they are; they own it." MusicOMHs Graeme Marsh said the album is "as good a debut as you could hope to hear, a fresh injection of pure brilliance and beauty to a genre that is creaking under the weight of mediocrity and a lack of adventurous inventiveness." AllMusic critic Heather Phares stated that "even if My Love Is Cool sacrifices some of Wolf Alice's earlier fury, the album is all the stronger for it." Neil McCormick of The Telegraph wrote, "They don't quite sound like the finished article, but there is a virtuous sense of their trying to make music in service of something profound." Pitchforks Laura Snapes stated: "The confident diversity of My Love Is Cool indicates a band who have their own thing all figured out, who shouldn't veer from their own strange path to live up to outdated narratives that dictate what a young British band should be."

Accolades

Track listing

Personnel
Credits adapted from the liner notes of My Love Is Cool.

Wolf Alice
 Ellie Rowsell – guitars, vocals, synths, programming, piano, Omnichord, Hammond organ
 Joff Oddie – guitars, backing vocals, synths, programming, banjo, violins
 Theo Ellis – bass guitar, backing vocals, synths
 Joel Amey – drums, percussion, backing vocals, lead vocals on "Swallowtail", synths, programming, guitars, Hammond organ

Additional personnel
 Mike Crossey – production, mixing, synths, programming
 Jonathan Gilmore – engineering
 Robin Schmidt – mastering
 Rachel Thomas – cover photo
 Samuel Burgess-Johnson – design

Charts

Certifications

|}

References

2015 debut albums
RCA Records albums
Wolf Alice albums